Percodermus niger is a species of beetle in the family Carabidae, the only species in the genus Percodermus.

References

Trechinae